Roberto Cortellini (born 19 February 1982) is an Italian professional footballer who plays as a midfielder.

Career

On 29 July 2015, he was signed by Lega Pro newcomer Fidelis Andria.

Domestic League Records

References

External links

1982 births
Footballers from Brescia
Living people
Italian footballers
Association football defenders
Brescia Calcio players
F.C. Lumezzane V.G.Z. A.S.D. players
Treviso F.B.C. 1993 players
A.C. Cesena players
S.P.A.L. players
Modena F.C. players
FeralpiSalò players
A.S.D. Barletta 1922 players
S.S. Fidelis Andria 1928 players
U.C. AlbinoLeffe players
Serie B players
Serie C players
S.E.F. Torres 1903 players